Max Moszkowicz Sr. (5 October 1926 – 27 January 2022) was a Dutch lawyer.

Biography 
Moszkowicz was born on 5 October 1926 in Essen, Westphalia, Prussia,  Germany. The Jewish Moszkowicz family fled Nazi Germany in 1933. During the Holocaust his parents were murdered. Max Moszkowicz himself survived Auschwitz.

He became well known in the Netherlands for defending the godfather of the Amsterdam underworld Klaas Bruinsma and the Heineken kidnappers Cor van Hout and Willem Holleeder. Moszkowicz was a member of the People's Party for Freedom and Democracy (VVD).

Moszkowicz was the father of former lawyers David Moszkowicz (born 1950), Robert Moszkowicz (born 1953), Max Moszkowicz Jr. (born 1955), and Bram Moszkowicz (born 1960). David, Robert, and Bram were disbarred in 2016, 2006, and 2013. He died on 27 January 2022, at the age of 95.

References

1926 births
2022 deaths
Auschwitz concentration camp survivors
Mauthausen concentration camp survivors
Members of the People's Party for Freedom and Democracy
Dutch Ashkenazi Jews
Dutch columnists
Jewish emigrants from Nazi Germany to the Netherlands
Dutch legal writers
Dutch people of World War II
Dutch people of German-Jewish descent
People from Maastricht
20th-century Dutch lawyers
20th-century Dutch jurists
20th-century Dutch male writers
21st-century Dutch lawyers
21st-century Dutch jurists
21st-century Dutch male writers